Joe Louis Clark (May 8, 1938 – December 29, 2020) was the principal of Eastside High School in Paterson, New Jersey. He is also the subject of the 1989 film Lean on Me, starring Morgan Freeman. Clark gained public attention in the 1980s for his unconventional and controversial disciplinary measures as the principal of Eastside High.

Early life
Clark was born in Rochelle, Georgia, on May 8, 1938. At the age of 6, Clark and his family moved to Newark, New Jersey, where he would graduate from Central High School. He went on to receive a bachelor's degree from William Paterson College, a master's degree from Seton Hall University, and an honorary doctorate from the U.S. Sports Academy. Clark was a Sergeant in the US Army Reserve, where he was assigned as a drill sergeant. He was selected for honoris causa membership in Omicron Delta Kappa in 1997 at SUNY Plattsburgh.

Career 
Clark was seen as an educator who was not afraid to get tough on difficult students, one who would often carry a bullhorn or a baseball bat at school. During his time as principal, Clark expelled over 300 students who were frequently tardy or absent from school, sold or used drugs in school, or caused trouble in school. Though some argue that his tough practices made the school far safer its academic accomplishments remained woefully inadequate. "While math scores are up 6% during Clark's reign, reading scores have barely budged: they remain in the bottom third of the nation's high school seniors. While a few more students are going to college -- 211, up from 182 in 1982 -- Clark has lost considerable ground in the battle against dropouts: when he arrived, Eastside's rate was 13%; now [in 1988] it is 21%." After his tenure as principal of Eastside High, Clark later served as director of the Essex County Detention House in Newark, New Jersey, a juvenile detention facility.

Legacy
Time magazine's cover article notes that Clark's style as principal was primarily disciplinarian in nature, focused on encouraging school pride and good behavior, although Clark was also portrayed as a former social activist in the film Lean on Me. "Clark's use of force may rid the school of unwanted students," commented Boston principal Thomas P. O'Neill Jr., "but he also may be losing kids who might succeed." George McKenna, former principal of Washington Preparatory High School in Los Angeles, often cited as a contemporary of Joe Clark as a school reformer with a similarly outgoing approach, was also critical. "Our role is to rescue and to be responsible," McKenna told Time. "If the students were not poor black children, Joe Clark would not be tolerated."

Other educators defended and praised Clark. "You cannot use a democratic and collaborative style when crisis is rampant and disorder reigns," said Kenneth Tewel, a former principal. "You need an autocrat to bring things under control." Some critics focused on the fact that while Clark had reestablished cleanliness and order, education scores had not substantially improved, which resulted in Eastside High being taken over by the state one year after Clark's departure in 1991.

Separate criticism focused on the social impact of expelling delinquent students to improve test scores, claiming that "tossing out the troublesome low achievers" simply moved the problems from the school onto the street. Clark defended the practice, saying teachers should not have to waste their time on students who do not want to learn; however, Time noted that the national dropout rate for such students remained high across the country and, with few alternatives available, each inner city school that had been able to reverse the trend had done so through "a bold, enduring principal" such as Clark. Further, he was "able to maintain or restore order without abandoning the students who are in trouble."

Personal life 
Clark was the father of Olympic track athletes, daughters Joetta Clark Diggs and Hazel Clark, and J.J. Clark, his son, who is a track coach. He was also the father-in-law of Olympic track athlete Jearl Miles Clark.

He resided in Newberry, Florida during his retirement. Clark died following a long illness on December 29, 2020, at the age of 83.

See also
 List of teachers portrayed in films

References

External links
 

1938 births
2020 deaths
Central High School (Newark, New Jersey) alumni
American school principals
Education in New Jersey
People from Paterson, New Jersey
William Paterson University alumni
Seton Hall University alumni
Rutgers University alumni
African-American educators
Right-wing populism in the United States
People from Rochelle, Georgia
Educators from New Jersey
20th-century African-American people
21st-century African-American people